Armada is the Spanish and Portuguese word for naval fleet, which also adopted into English, Malay and Indonesian for the same meaning, or an adjective meaning 'armed'; Armáda is the Czech and Slovak word for armed forces.

Armada may also refer to:

Military

Explorations and military campaigns
 Portuguese India Armadas (armadas da Índia), fleets of ships dispatched from Portugal to India, following the sea route opened up by Vasco da Gama in 1497–1499
 2nd Portuguese India Armada (Cabral, 1500)
 3rd Portuguese India Armada (Nova, 1501)
 4th Portuguese India Armada (Gama, 1502)
 5th Portuguese India Armada (Albuquerque, 1503)
 6th Portuguese India Armada (Albergaria, 1504)
 7th Portuguese India Armada (Almeida, 1505)

Military campaigns
 Spanish Armada or Great Armada, an unsuccessfully attempted invasion of England by Spain in 1588
 English Armada or Counter Armada, an unsuccessful English naval campaign in 1589 aimed at capturing Lisbon and other coastal towns from Spain
 2nd Spanish Armada 2nd unsuccessful Spanish invasion of England
 3rd Spanish Armada 3rd unsuccessful Spanish invasion of England
 Armada of 1779 or Other Armada, an unsuccessfully attempted invasion of England by France and Spain in 1779

Ships
 HMS Armada, two ships in the British Royal Navy
 USS Armada, World War II minesweeper of the US Navy

Armed forces
 Armada, Spanish Navy
 Armada Bolivariana de Venezuela, Bolivarian Armada of Venezuela
 Armáda České republiky, the Military of the Czech Republic
 Armada de Chile, Chilean Navy
 Armada Ecuatoriana, Ecuadorian Navy
 Armada Nacional, Colombian National Armada
 Armada Portuguesa, Portuguese Navy
 Armada de la República Argentina, Argentine Navy
 Marina Armada, Mexican Navy
 Armada de Barlovento, a subdivision of the Spanish Navy assigned to the Windward Islands during the 1700s
 Komando Armada Barat (Western Fleet Command) and Komando Armada Timur (Eastern Fleet Command), fleets of the Indonesian Navy
 Armada al-Makhzniya (1935) is a paramilitary organization of Moroccan warriors (makhazniya) affiliated to the Inspectorate of the Caliphate Forces and its command center in the CPFA in Tetouan. They are placed under the command of the territorial authorities. Their mission is to accompany the Caliph during his travels, to establish security in the cities and villages in the Riff , which are under Spanish protection in Morocco. And now they are known as Auxiliary Forces in morocco

Arts and entertainment

Music
 Armada (album), an album by black metal band Keep of Kalessin
 The Armada (band), a band formed by ex-The Tea Party lead singer Jeff Martin
 Armada Music, a music label created by Armin van Buuren
 Armada (music group), a pop band from Indonesia

Gaming
 Armada (video game), a video game which was popular on the Sega Dreamcast
 Star Trek: Armada, a Star Trek game published by Activision
 Wing Commander: Armada, a video game by Origin Systems
 Battlefleet Gothic: Armada, a Warhammer 40,000 game developed by Tindalos Interactive and published by Focus Home Interactive

Publishing
 Armada (novel), a 2015 novel by Ernest Cline
 The Armada (book) (1959), a Pulitzer Prize-winning history of the Spanish Armada by Garrett Mattingly
 Armada (comics), a division of Acclaim Comics Inc., which published licensed own properties
 Armada Books, a now defunct publishing house, one time publishers of the Billy Bunter children's novels

TV series
 Transformers: Armada

Episodes
 "Armada", an episode of Transformers: Prime.

Businesses

 Armada (company), a company that produces alpine skis and outerwear
 Armada Asset Management, LLC, a holding company based in Newport Beach, CA
 Armada Centre, shopping centre in Plymouth, England
 ARMADA (SoC) product family by Marvell Technology

People
 Adam Lindgren (born 1993), professional Super Smash Bros. player known as Armada
 General Alfonso Armada, a Spanish military officer condemned as one of the plotters of the 23-F attempted coup
 Juan Armada y Losada, Spanish politician

Places
 Armada, Arkansas, a ghost town
 Armada, Michigan, a small village in the US
 Armada Township, Buffalo County, Nebraska
 Armada Towers, in Dubai, U.A.E.
 Armada House, in Bristol, England
 Armada Road Multi-Family District, a U.S. historic district in Venice, Florida

Sports teams
 Armada Rijeka, a football-fan club from Rijeka, Croatia
 Peña Armada Sur, a football-fan club from Tenerife, Spain
 La Armada, a nickname for the Spain Davis Cup team
 Long Beach Armada, a professional baseball team based in Long Beach, California
 Blainville-Boisbriand Armada, a junior ice hockey team based in Boisbriand, Quebec
 Jacksonville Armada FC, a professional soccer team based in Jacksonville, Florida

Transportation
 Mahindra Armada, an Indian SUV/MUV
 Nissan Armada, a Japanese-American full-size SUV

Other uses
 Compaq Armada, a model of laptop computer
 Armada (moth), a genus of moths of the family Noctuidae
 Armada (Bas-Lag), the name of a fictional floating city in China Miéville's novel The Scar
 Armada (Capoeira), a move in the Brazilian martial art capoeira
 Armada de Molucca, 1519 exploration fleet led by Ferdinand Magellan

See also
 Armado (disambiguation)
 Armata (disambiguation)